Mehus (pronounced May-hews and meaning middle house in Norwegian) is a last name common to Flemish and Norwegian people. In the United States of America it is most common in North Dakota.

A "John de Mehus" is mentioned in the Feet of fines court records in England in 1196. He was the son of Matilda, widow of Robert Meaux, and was later referred to as John de Meaux. Meaux is a village in the East Riding of Yorkshire, named after Meaux in Normandy.  The Surtees Society's editor in 1897 says of the  "Johannem de Meals" in the Latin text of a 1202 record in that he was "Better known under the form Meaux or Melsa. In 1196 he is called John de Mehus." He is mentioned by various sources as an early bearer of the names Muse, Mewis, and Mewze.

People with the surname

 Livio Mehus (born 1630), Flemish painter 
 John H. Mehus, a  United States Navy ensign in command of the USS Clearwater County on its commissioning in 1944
 Laurelle Mehus, American model and actress, appeared in the 1990 film Pretty Woman
 Ingrid Berg Mehus, subject of Alexander Ryback's 2009 song "Fairytale"

See also
Mehu, an Ancient Egypt vizier who lived in the Sixth Dynasty, around 2300 BC

References

Surnames